WUCX-FM, 90.1 FM in Bay City, Michigan, is a public radio station licensed to Central Michigan University and operated jointly with Delta College. It airs programming (both local and syndicated) separate from WCMU-FM between 5 a.m. and 3 p.m. on weekdays, from 6 a.m. until 6 p.m. on Saturdays, and from 6 a.m. until 12 p.m on Sundays. The station simulcasts WCMU the remainder of the time. WUCX, which went on the air in September 1989, identified as "Q90.1" (with the "Q" standing for "Quality," after its television counterpart, WDCQ) until 2020 during non-simulcast day parts. Programming offers a mixture of news and talk (including programming from NPR, PRI and APM), as well as several types of music. WUCX-FM's second HD Radio subchannel, branded "WCMU News and Talk", airs numerous public radio talk shows around the clock. WUCX-FM is the only station in the Saginaw, Midland, and Bay City metropolitan area that broadcasts in HD.

References

Michiguide.com - WUCX-FM History

External links

UCX-FM
NPR member stations
Central Michigan University
Radio stations established in 1989